The Furgghorn (German, Italian: Cima del Breuil) is a mountain of the Pennine Alps, located on the boundary between the canton of Valais (Switzerland) and Aosta Valley (northern Italy). It lies on the range south-east of the Matterhorn, near the Theodul Pass. The closest locality is Breuil-Cervinia on the Italian side. The closest locality on the Swiss side is Zermatt.

References

External links
Furgghorn on Hikr

Mountains of the Alps
Alpine three-thousanders
Mountains of Aosta Valley
Mountains of Valais
Italy–Switzerland border
International mountains of Europe
Mountains of Switzerland